Bohdan Lachert  (13 June 1900 – 8 January 1987) was a Polish architect, member of Praesens group.

He designed a lot of buildings with his friend Józef Szanajca, like modern villas ast Saska Kępa (inspired by Le Corbusier's ideas) or Polish pavilon at EXPO Paris 1937. After World War II he designed part of Muranów (on the ruins of Warsaw Ghetto) and Warsaw cemetery of soldiers of Red Army. Author of Józef Szanajca monument.

Winner of SARP Honorary Award in 1984.

Bibliography 

 

1900 births
1987 deaths
20th-century Polish architects
Modernist architects
Recipients of the State Award Badge (Poland)